Šumskas Manor is a former residential manor in Šumskas, Vilnius District Municipality, Lithuania.

References

Manor houses in Lithuania
Classicism architecture in Lithuania